Miguel García García (1908–1981) was a Spanish anarchist and writer. He was a political prisoner during the Franco era.

In his youth, García became affiliated with anarchism and his family belonged to the Confederación Nacional del Trabajo (CNT). As a young newsboy, after being hurt at a rally for greater pay, he left Barcelona for France, where he learned the language. During the Spanish Civil War, he drove arms across the French border into Republican Spain. While his fellow Barcelonans confronted a government building, García led a cohort to raid gunshops in the wealthier part of the city. During the war, he fought on the Saragossa and Madrid fronts, and after the anarchists' defeat, spent two and a half years in a concentration camp where he befriended Josep Lluís i Facerias and El Quico. Upon their release, they together joined the Spanish Resistance, in which they reorganized the CNT, smuggled guns and people across borders, and sabotaged Franco and the Axis. García was among the few who survived.

García was captured in 1949 and sentenced to death, but international pressure led his sentence to be reduced to 20 years in prison. He met Stuart Christie in the Carabanchel Prison. After his release and exile in 1969 García wrote about his incarceration in Franco's Prisoner (1971). Reviews compared his autobiography to In Hiding, written by a socialist mayor who opposed anarchists. García's book was translated into German. García became fluent in Italian and learned rudimentary English in prison so as to read the English-language press. He decided to travel across Western Europe to speak against Francoist Spain and organize wider resistance. 

In London, in the mid-1970s Garcia was running the Centro Iberico at Chalk Farm (later in Holborn and, after his death, on the Harrow Road, Notting Hill), a meeting place for sympathetic exiles and anarchist exiles. Through the Anarchist Black Cross, which published Black Flag, Miguel helped raise funds for Spanish prisoners and their families. He worked with Albert Meltzer who wrote of García's influence on The Angry Brigade, the First of May Group, and the Iberian Liberation Movement, among other groups internationally. García died of tuberculosis.

References

Selected works 

 Franco's Prisoner 
 Prisionero de Franco.  Los anarquistas en la lucha contra la dictadura.  Traducción y notas José Ignacio Alvarez Fernández 
 Looking Back After Twenty Years of Jail: Questions and Answers on the Spanish Anarchist Resistance 
 Unknown heroes: biographies of Anarchist resistance fighters

Further reading 

 Christie, Stuart Granny Made Me An Anarchist

External links 
 Miguel Garcia articles at the Kate Sharpley Library

1908 births
1981 deaths
Writers from Barcelona
Confederación Nacional del Trabajo members
Spanish anarchists
20th-century deaths from tuberculosis
Tuberculosis deaths in England
Exiles of the Spanish Civil War in the United Kingdom
Spanish expatriates in England
20th-century Spanish male writers